Rubellius Plautus (33–62 AD) was a Roman noble and a political rival of Emperor Nero. Through his mother Julia, he was a relative of the Julio-Claudian dynasty. He was the grandson of Drusus (only son of Tiberius Caesar), and the great-grandson of Tiberius and his brother Drusus.  Through his great-grandmothers Vipsania Agrippina and Antonia Minor, he was also descended from Marcus Vipsanius Agrippa and Mark Antony. He was descended from Augustus' sister Octavia Minor, herself a grand-niece of Julius Caesar.

Parentage
Plautus' father was Gaius Rubellius Blandus. Blandus' family originated from Tibur (modern Tivoli) and were of the Equestrian Class. His father died in 38. His mother was the only daughter of Drusus, and had previously been married to her cousin Nero Julius Caesar, without issue. Plautus derived his cognomen from his great grandfather Lucius Sergius Plautus, and may have used his nomen gentilicium Sergius as his own praenomen as a lead pipe is attested with the name "Sergius Rubellius Plautus", but this person may have been his son.

Between 43 and 45, his mother Julia became an innocent victim to the intrigues of Empress Valeria Messalina. One possibility is that the young Plautus was seen by Messalina as a rival to her son Britannicus. Emperor Claudius (who was husband to Messalina, father to Brittanicus and maternal uncle to Julia) did not secure any legal defense for his niece. Consequently, Julia was executed. However Julia was considered to be a virtuous person by those who knew her.

Marriage
Plautus married Antistia Pollitta, daughter to Lucius Antistius Vetus. His father-in-law served as Consul in 55, Legatus of Germania Superior in 55–56, and Proconsul of Asia in 64–65. Plautus was considered a loving husband and father. The names of his children, however, are not known. (None of them survived Nero's purges in 66).

Philosophy
Plautus appears to have been a follower of Stoicism. According to Tacitus, Tigellinus wrote to Nero: "Plautus again, with his great wealth, does not so much as affect a love of repose, but he flaunts before us his imitations of the old Romans, and assumes the self-consciousness of the Stoics along with a philosophy, which makes men restless, and eager for a busy life."  When he was exiled from Rome by Nero, Plautus was accompanied by the famous Stoic teacher Musonius Rufus.  He was associated with a group of Stoics who criticized the perceived tyranny and autocratic rule of certain emperors, referred to today as the Stoic Opposition.

Nero's jealousy
In 55, Junia Silana, sister of Caligula's first wife Junia Claudilla, a rival of Empress Agrippina the Younger and the ex-wife of Messalina's lover Gaius Silius, accused Agrippina of plotting to overthrow Nero to place Plautus on the throne. Nero took no action at the time, but over time, Nero's relationship with Silana warmed while his relationship with his mother soured. After a comet appeared in 60, public gossip renewed rumors of Nero's fall and Plautus' rise.  Nero exiled Plautus in 60 to his estate in Asia with his family.

In 62, after rumors that Plautus was in negotiations with the eastern general Gnaeus Domitius Corbulo over rebellion, Plautus was executed by Nero. When his head was given to Nero by a freedman, Nero mocked how frightening the long nose of Plautus was.

In 66, his widow, children and father-in-law were executed, victims of the increasing brutality of Nero. Tacitus states Plautus was old fashioned in tastes, his bearing austere and he lived a secluded life. He was greatly respected by his peers, and the execution of his family was cause for consternation among those who knew him.

Notes

References

Further reading
 

33 births
62 deaths
1st-century Romans
Julio-Claudian dynasty
Plautus